Bhandavpur Jain Tirth is situated in Bhundwa village, near Bhinmal (भीनमाल). It is Jain tirth (pilgrimage site) of the Jalore district of Rajasthan.

Inscriptions
It seems to be an ancient tirth place as per inscription. The idol established on Margshirsh Shukla Saptami of 756 CE (VS 813 ) was re-established in the temple on Marrgshirsh Shukla 5 of 1176 CE (VS 1233). A description of its establishment on Poush Shukla 9 of 1283 CE (VS 1340) is also found.

Architecture 
Bhandavpur Jain Tirth is a large double storied structure. The upper part of façade is pyramidal structure with elaborate carvings and sculptures. The temple features life size sculpture of elephant with riders on each side of entrance. The pillars inside the temple are highly ornated.

References

Citations

Sources 
 

Jain temples in Rajasthan
Tourist attractions in Jalore district
12th-century Jain temples